Janet Jean Gerhauser Carpenter (born August 9, 1932 in Minneapolis, Minnesota) is an American former pair skater who competed with John Nightingale, twice winning the silver medal at the United States Figure Skating Championships and taking part in the 1952 Winter Olympic Games. She also competed in fours with Nightingale, Marilyn Thomsen, and Marlyn Thomsen and won the 1949 North American title. After her competitive career ended, she was a judge and a coach. She was inducted into the U.S. Figure Skating Hall of Fame in 2008.

Results

Pairs
(with Nightingale)

Fours
(with Nightingale, Thomsen, and Thomsen)

References

External links
Sports-R

1932 births
Living people
American female pair skaters
Figure skaters at the 1952 Winter Olympics
Olympic figure skaters of the United States
21st-century American women
20th-century American women